Zeynep Acet (born March 5, 1995) is a Turkish Paralympian athlete competing in the T53 disability class sprint events of 100m and 400m. She is a member of the Bağcılar Belediyesi Disabled SK in Istanbul.

She won the title in the women's disabled category at the 2015 Istanbul Marathon with 2:11:13 before her club mate Hamide Kurt.

She competed in three events at the 2016 IPC Athletics European Championships held in Grosseto, Italy.  She won the silver medal in the 200m T53 event at the  2018 IPC Athletics European Championships in Berlin, Germany running in 35.78. She took the bronze medal in the 100m T53 event of the 2021 World Para Athletics European Championships in Bydgoszcz, Poland.  She won further the silver medal in the 400m T53 event in the same championship.

References

1995 births
Living people
Female competitors in athletics with disabilities
Turkish female wheelchair racers
Turkish female sprinters
Paralympic athletes of Turkey
People with paraplegia
Wheelchair category Paralympic competitors
Athletes (track and field) at the 2016 Summer Paralympics
Medalists at the World Para Athletics European Championships
Athletes (track and field) at the 2020 Summer Paralympics
21st-century Turkish sportswomen
Islamic Solidarity Games medalists in athletics